Goddamned is the debut studio album by American singer–songwriter Jay Brannan, released in the United States on July 1, 2008, and in the UK on August 25. The album features eleven original songs; a bonus track is included by purchase via iTunes.

Track listing
 "Can't Have It All"
 "Half-Boyfriend"
 "American Idol"
 "A Death Waltz"
 "At First Sight" 
 "Housewife"
 "Goddamned"
 "Home"
 "Bowlegged & Starving"
 "On All Fours"
 "String-A-Long Song"
 "Ever After Happily" (iTunes bonus track)

Critical reception

Jer Fairall of PopMatters gave the album a mixed review, stating "with likeability to spare, Brannan's music nevertheless needs to grow up a bit". Dave Hughes of Slant Magazine gave a negative review, stating "Brannan is a talented and tenacious guy, it's also impossible to recommend Goddamned".

Personnel
 Jay Brannan - singing, guitar, piano and organ (for "Bowlegged & Starving")
 Oliver Kraus - cello
 Jon Flaugher - double bass
 Bitch - violin
 Michael Moore - drums and percussion
 Fil Krohnengold - piano and organ
 Will Golden, Mike Terry, Jared Nugent - engineering
 Bryan Cook - mixing
 Mark Chalecki - mastering
 Christie Little - package design

References

External links

2008 albums
Jay Brannan albums